Neerabup National Park is a national park in the City of Wanneroo in Western Australia, situated approximately  north of Perth.

It contains no car parks and roads or any other facilities and attracts no entrance fee.

The area protects part of an ancient Indigenous Australian migration route between Lake Joondalup and Loch McNess (in Yanchep National Park). This later became are well used stock route and then part of the Yaberoo Budjara Heritage Trail. The trail is based on the Yellalonga tribes movements between the lakes and highlights features of historical, aboriginal and natural significance.

The park lies within the Northern Swan Coastal Plain Important Bird Area, so identified by BirdLife International because of its importance in supporting several thousand Short-billed Black Cockatoos during the non-breeding season.

See also
 Protected areas of Western Australia

References 

National parks of Western Australia
Protected areas established in 1965
Important Bird Areas of Western Australia
Neerabup, Western Australia